Coccothrinax gracilis (latanier) is a palm which is endemic to the island of Hispaniola.

References

gracilis
Trees of Haiti
Trees of the Dominican Republic 
Plants described in 1929
Taxa named by Max Burret